This is a list of films which have placed number one at the weekend box office in the United Kingdom during 2017.

Films

References

External links
Weekend box office figures | BFI

2017
United Kingdom
2017 in British cinema